Dorien Herremans is a Belgian computer music researcher. Herremans is currently an assistant professor in the Singapore University of Technology and Design, and research scientist (joint appointment) at the Institute of High Performance Computing, A*STAR. She also works as a certified instructor for the NVIDIA Deep Learning Institute and is director of SUTD Game Lab. Before going to SUTD, she was a recipient of the Marie Sklodowska-Curie Postdoctoral Fellowship at the Centre for Digital Music (C4DM) at Queen Mary University of London, where she worked on the project MorpheuS: Hybrid Machine Learning – Optimization techniques To Generate Structured Music Through Morphing And Fusion. She received her Ph.D. in Applied Economics on the topic of Computer Generation and Classification of Music through Operations Research Methods. She graduated as a commercial engineer in management information systems at the [University of Antwerp] in 2005. After that, she worked as a Drupal consultant and was an IT lecturer at the Les Roches University in Bluche, Switzerland. She also worked as a mandaatassistent at the University of Antwerp, in the domain of operations management, supply chain management and operations research.

Herremans' current work focuses on automatic music generation, data mining for music classification (hit prediction) and other novel applications in the intersections of AI, machine learning/optimization and music. She is a senior member of the IEEE. In 2021 she was nominated to the Singapore 100 Women in Technology list.

Herremans' research on dance hit prediction, automatic piano fingering and AI automatic music generation systems (e.g. MorpheuS) has received attention in the popular press, including international magazines such as Motherboard from Vice Magazine, Channel News Asia's Documentary 'Algorithms: Episode 1: Rage Against The Machine, The Examiner, Belgian national TV and Belgian and French national radio.

Selected publications
 Herremans D., Chuan C.H, Chew E. 2017. A Functional Taxonomy of Music Generation Systems. ACM Computing Surveys
 Dorien Herremans D., Martens D., Sörensen K. 2014. Dance Hit Song Prediction. Journal of New Music Research, Special Issue on Music and Machine Learning. 43:3. pp. 291-302
 Herremans, D., & Sörensen, K. (2013). Composing fifth species counterpoint music with a variable neighborhood search algorithm. Expert systems with applications, 40(16), 6427-6437
 Herremans, D., & Chew, E. (2017). MorpheuS: generating structured music with constrained patterns and tension. IEEE Transactions on Affective Computing
 Chuan, C. H., & Herremans, D. (2018, April). Modeling temporal tonal relations in polyphonic music through deep networks with a novel image-based representation. In Proc. of the thirty-second AAAI conference on artificial intelligence
 Lin, K. W. E., Balamurali, B. T., Koh, E., Lui, S., & Herremans, D. (2020). Singing voice separation using a deep convolutional neural network trained by ideal binary mask and cross entropy. Neural Computing and Applications, 32(4), 1037-1050
 Chuan, C. H., Agres, K., & Herremans, D. (2020). From context to concept: exploring semantic relationships in music with word2vec. Neural Computing and Applications, 32(4), 1023-1036
 Sturm, B. L., Ben-Tal, O., Monaghan, Ú., Collins, N., Herremans, D., Chew, E., ... & Pachet, F. (2019). Machine learning research that matters for music creation: A case study. Journal of New Music Research, 48(1), 36-55

References 

1982 births
Living people